The third Sarawak state election was held from 15 September 1979 to 22 September 1979. It is the first time that Sarawak held state election separately from the 1978 Malaysian general election. This is also the first time that the election rallies were banned in Sarawak. However, candidates and political parties were free to hold talks and house to house canvassing for votes.

Results
Sarawak Barisan Nasional won 45 out of 48 seats in the Council Negri (now Sarawak State Legislative Assembly) and 61.2% of the popular vote. A total of 44 seats were contested in this election. The remaining four seats were won uncontested by Barisan Nasional. A total of 41 candidates lost their election deposits as they failed to take one-eighth of the total votes cast for all the candidates in their constituencies. A total of four election petitions were filed in Sarawak high court. Of these election petitions, one was subsequently withdrawn while the remaining petitions were adjourned in the year 1980. 

The seats that were won uncontested by Barisan Nasional are:
 N18 - Batang Ai
 N20 - Layar
 N31 - Balingian
 N34 - Meluan

The full list of representatives is shown below:

Summary

See also
 Elections in Sarawak
 List of Malaysian State Assembly Representatives (1978–1982)

References

Sarawak state elections
1979 elections in Malaysia
Sarawak